A by-election was held for the New South Wales Legislative Assembly electorate of Sydney-Pyrmont on 24 May 1902 because of the resignation of Sam Smith to accept an appointment to the Court of Arbitration.

Dates

Result

Sam Smith resigned.

See also
Electoral results for the district of Sydney-Pyrmont
List of New South Wales state by-elections

Notes

References

1902 elections in Australia
New South Wales state by-elections
1900s in New South Wales